Bozdag means "gray mountain" in Turkish and it may refer to 

Bozdağ, a town in Ödemiş, İzmir Province, Turkey
Bozdağ, Çivril
Mount Bozdağ, a mountain near Mingachevir, Azerbaijan
Falakro, a mountain in Drama prefecture, Greece

People with the surname
Bekir Bozdağ, Turkish politician
Muhammed Bozdağ, Turkish writer
  

Turkish-language surnames